Nitrosobenzene is the organic compound with the formula C6H5NO. It is one of the prototypical organic nitroso compounds. Characteristic of its functional group, it is a dark green species that exists in equilibrium with its pale yellow dimer. Both monomer and dimer are diamagnetic.

Monomer-dimer equilibrium
Nitrosobenzene and other nitrosoarenes typically participate in a monomer-dimer equilibrium. The dimers are often favored in the solid state, whereas the deeply colored monomers are favored in dilute solution or at higher temperatures.  The dimers can be formulated as Ar(O−)N+=N+(O−)Ar.  They exist as cis- and trans-isomers due to the presence of the N–N double bond.  The dimers are sometimes called azobenzenedioxides. The cis-trans isomerization occurs via the intermediacy of the monomer.  

In the case of nitrosobenzene itself, the metastable monomeric form could be prepared by sublimation onto a cold finger. The monomeric material is selectively sublimed due to its lower molecular weight and is collected on a cold finger as lustrous, dark green crystals. Over time, the monomeric material dimerizes to give the parent azobenzene-N,N′-dioxide as a pale yellow solid. As dictated by Le Chatelier's principle, nitrosobenzene exists in the solution phase as a mixture of monomer and dimer in dynamic equilibrium whose composition is dependent on temperature (monomer favored at higher temperature) and concentration (monomer favored at low concentration), as well as the identity of the medium (gas phase or solvent).

Preparation
Nitrosobenzene was first prepared by Adolf von Baeyer by the reaction of diphenylmercury and nitrosyl bromide:

(C6H5)2Hg + BrNO → C6H5NO + C6H5HgBr

A modern synthesis entails reduction of nitrobenzene to phenylhydroxylamine (C6H5NHOH) which is then oxidized by sodium dichromate (Na2Cr2O7).

Nitrosobenzene can also be prepared by oxidation of aniline using peroxymonosulfuric acid (Caro's acid) or potassium peroxymonosulfate under biphasic conditions. It is usually purified by sublimation or by steam distillation, where it comes over as a green liquid that solidifies to a colorless solid.

Characteristic reactions
Nitrosobenzene undergoes Diels–Alder reactions with dienes. Condensation with anilines affords azobenzene derivatives in a reaction known as the Mills reaction. Reduction of nitrosobenzene produces aniline.

Most characteristically, nitrosobenzene condenses with active methylene groups, such as those of malonic esters and phenylacetonitrile. Phenylacetonitrile (PhCH2CN) gives the imine (PhC(CN)=NPh) in a reaction known as the Ehrlich-Sachs reaction:

Ph–CH2-CN + Ph–NO → Ph–CH(CN)–N(OH)–Ph (oxyamination adduct) → PhC(CN)=N–Ph

Sometimes condensation with active methylene compounds gives products of O-nitroso-aldol reaction:

R–CH2-CHO + Ph–NO → R–CH(CHO)–O–NHPh (aminoxylation adduct)

References

Phenyl compounds
Nitroso compounds